William Theodore Cooley (born February 4, 1966) is a United States Air Force major general who previously served as commander of the Air Force Research Laboratory.  He is the first general officer in US Air Force history to be court-martialed. He was relieved of command after allegations of abusive sexual contact against him were reported.

Early life and education

William Theodore Cooley was born in Fort Worth, Texas, on February 4, 1966. He graduated from Highland High School in Albuquerque, New Mexico, in 1984. He attended Rensselaer Polytechnic Institute on an Air Force ROTC scholarship from which he received a Bachelor of Science degree in mechanical engineering in 1988 and was commissioned a second lieutenant in the US Air Force. After leaving Rensselaer, Cooley attended graduate school at the University of New Mexico and received a Masters of Science in mechanical engineering in 1990 while simultaneously working at the Sandia National Laboratory. After leaving New Mexico, Cooley worked from 1990 to 1993 at Air Force Wright Laboratory at Wright-Patterson AFB on photovoltaic solar cells and later crystal growth of III-V compounds using molecular beam epitaxy. In 1993, Cooley entered the doctoral program at Air Force Institute of Technology. He received a Doctor of Philosophy in applied physics in 1997 while working under the supervision of Professor Robert Hengehold.

Military career
Cooley was commissioned a second lieutenant in the US Air Force after completing the Air Force ROTC program at Rensselaer Polytechnic Institute in 1988. In 2015, Cooley was promoted to brigadier general.

Abusive sexual contact allegations and court-martial
Cooley faced a general court-martial at Wright-Patterson Air Force Base in Ohio in April 2022, charged with three counts of violating Article 120 of the Uniform Code of Military Justice by committing abusive sexual contact. On April 23, 2022, Cooley was found guilty of one count abusive sexual contact for kissing his sister-in-law after a family barbecue. Cooley was sentenced on April 26, 2022, to a public reprimand and total forfeiture of $54,550 in pay over a five month period. He is the first general officer in US Air Force history to be court-martialed.

Awards and decorations 
Cooley has been awarded and is authorized to wear the following major honors as of June 2020:

Effective dates of promotion

References 

1966 births
Living people
People from Fort Worth, Texas
United States Air Force generals
United States Air Force personnel who were court-martialed
Recipients of the Defense Superior Service Medal
Recipients of the Legion of Merit
Recipients of the Meritorious Service Medal (United States)